The Lyulka TR-3 was a Soviet axial turbojet designed after World War II by Arkhip Mikhailovich Lyulka.

Development
The Lyulka TR-3 was a single-shaft turbojet with a seven-stage axial compressor. It had an annular combustion chamber with 24 nozzles and a single-stage turbine. It had a fixed exhaust nozzle and had a pneumatic SV-3 starting unit, although this was later replaced by a turbine unit. It was used in the Ilyushin Il-30 during 1949, but was superseded by later versions. The improved TR-3A version was redesignated as the AL-5 to honor Lyulka in 1950.

Applications
 Ilyushin Il-30
 Sukhoi Su-17 (1949)

Specifications (TR-3)

See also

References
Notes

Bibliography

 Kay, Anthony L. Turbojet: History and Development 1930–1960: Volume 2: USSR, USA, Japan, France, Canada, Sweden, Switzerland, Italy, Czechoslovakia and Hungary. Marlborough, Wiltshire: Crowood Press, 2007 
 Gunston, Bill. The Osprey Encyclopaedia of Russian Aircraft 1875–1995. London, Osprey, 1995

External links
 http://www.ctrl-c.liu.se/misc/RAM/eng_al-5.html

TR-3
1940s turbojet engines